Oh Yeah, Ooh Yeah, or other variants may refer to:

Music

Albums 
Oh Yeah (Charles Mingus album), 1962
Oh Yeah? (album), 1976 album by Jan Hammer
Ooh Yeah! (album), 1988 album by Hall & Oates
Oh Yeah! (album), 1993 album by KC and the Sunshine Band
O, Yeah! Ultimate Aerosmith Hits, 2002

Songs 
 "Oh Yeah" (Ash song), 1996
 "Oh Yeah" (Chickenfoot song), 2009
 "Oh Yeah" (Foxy Brown song), 2001
 "Oh Yeah" (GD & TOP song), 2010
 "Oh Yeah" (Rottin Razkals song), 1995
 "Oh Yeah" (Roxy Music song), 1980
 "Oh Yeah" (The Subways song), 2005
 "Oh Yeah" (Taxiride song), 2005
 "Oh Yeah" (Yello song), 1985, featured in  Ferris Bueller's Day Off and other films
 "Oh Yeah!" (Green Day song), 2020
 "Oh Yeah!" (Princess Princess song), 1990
 "Oh Yeah (Work)", a 2007 song by Lil' Scrappy
 "O Yeah" (End of Fashion song), 2005
 "Oh Yeah", a 2012 song by Aerosmith from Music from Another Dimension!
 "Oh Yeah", a 2012 song by Bat for Lashes from The Haunted Man
 "Oh Yeah", a 2010 song by Big Time Rush from BTR
 "Oh Yeah", a 1971 song by Can from Tago Mago
 "Oh Yeah", a 2012 song by Chris Brown from Fortune
 "Oh Yeah", a 1997 song by Daft Punk from Homework
 "Oh Yeah", a 2010 song by Jaicko
 "Oh Yeah", a 2017 song by Lil Wayne and T-Pain from T-Wayne
 "Oh Yeah", a 2009 song by MBLAQ from Just BLAQ
 "Oh Yeah", a 2014 song by T.I. from Paperwork
 "Oh Yeah!", a 1991 song by Alanis Morissette from Alanis
 "Oh, Yeah!", a 2002 song by the Big Tymers from Hood Rich
 "Ooh Yeah" (song), a 2008 song by Moby
 "Ooh Yeah", a 2003 song by the Riverboat Gamblers from Something to Crow About
 "Ooh-Yeah", a 1998 song by Lee Ritenour from This Is Love

Other uses 
 Oh Yeah (music centre), a music centre in Northern Ireland
 Oh, Yeah! (film), a 1929 American action film directed by Tay Garnett
 Oh Yeah! Cartoons, an American cartoon program
 Oh Yeah! (advertising slogan), an advertising slogan commonly said in Kool-Aid commercials

See also 
Ah Yeah (disambiguation)